Astropyga is a genus of sea urchins of the family Diadematidae. Their armour is covered with spines. Astropyga was first scientifically described in 1855 by John Edward Gray.

Species
According to World Register of Marine Species:

References

External links
 Astropyga Gray, 1825, p. 426.

Diadematidae
Taxa named by John Edward Gray